Igor Vladimirovich Zyuzin (born May 29, 1960) is a Russian businessman, a Chairman of the Board of Directors and a major shareholder of the mining and steel group "Mechel".

Biography
Zyuzin was born in Kimovsk, Tula Oblast on May 29, 1960. In 1982, he graduated from the Tula Polytechnic Institute with an honors bachelor's degree equivalent in mining engineering. He graduated from the Tula Polytechnic Institute’s Graduate School in 1985, earning his Kandidat of Technical Sciences degree (PhD equivalent) in 1986. He also graduated from the Kuzbass Polytechnic Institute (in [Kemerovo]) by correspondence with a bachelor's degree equivalent in Economics of Mining in 1992.

Zyuzin began working at Raspadskaya Mine (in Kemerovo Oblast) in 1987. He started out as a mining foreman and was promoted to mine section supervising foreman and acting senior process engineer in 1989. After an accident, he received disability status, and transferred to Raspadskaya design bureau. He was able to become an intermediary between the government and miners during the 1989 mining strikes. This was the reason why Zyuzin was appointed Deputy CEO for Marketing and Foreign Trade in 1990.

Igor Zyuzin became CEO of Kuzbasskaya Central Refinery in October 1993, and worked at the company for four years. He was Chairman of the Board of Mezhdurechensk Ugol OJSC in 1997 – 1999, and was first elected Chairman of Southern Kuzbass Coal Company OJSC in May 1999. As a key figure at Southern Kuzbass, he was appointed to the Entrepreneurship Council led by Russian Prime Minister Mikhail Kasyanov in 2000.

He joined the Board of Directors of Mechel OJSC (Chelyabinsk Steel Plant) from June 2001, and established the Mechel Group in 2003. Igor Zyuzin's most recent positions at Mechel included:
 From January 2004 — Chairman of the Board Mechel Steel Group OJSC.
 From December 2006 to July 2010 — CEO of Mechel OJSC.
 From July 2010 — Chairman of the Board of Mechel.

Entrepreneurial activities
Zyuzin first went into business for himself in the early 1990s. he established Uglemet (the company names combines Russian words for “coal” and “metal”) in 1994, which received substantial coal sale quotas. Zyuzin and his business partner Vladimir Yorikh traded coal produced by Kuzbass mines, and then began buying up stock in mining companies themselves. Yorikh was in charge of finance and sales, while Zyuzin was responsible for other business aspects. They bought Southern Kuzbass, Mezhdurechenskugol and a number of other companies in the late 1990s.

The partnership of Zyuzin and Yorikh acquired a controlling stake in Mechel OJSC for US$133 million in 2001 and continued buying steel makers. Mechel was taken public in 2004 (Vladimir Yorikh has most of the credit for the successful IPO), and Zyuzin and Yorikh retained a 47.8% equity stake each, valued at US$1.1 billion at the time. Yorikh had sold off all of his stake by the end of 2006, selling most of it to Zyuzin, who borrowed US$1 billion to finance the acquisition. Mechel’s February 2007 US SEC filing showed Igor Zyuzin as the beneficiary holder of 68.2% of the company’s equity.

After thus amassing a controlling stake in Mechel, Zyuzin began an aggressive debt-financed asset acquisition spree. He spent US$2.47 billion on acquisitions in 2007 and US$2.8 billion in 2008. The price of steel, metals and coal (Mechel’s core products) and Mechel stock price were rising during this time. Zyuzin continued buying new assets even when he asked banks to restructure his debt in 2009. According to several market experts, this high-risk strategy brought the company to the brink of bankruptcy by the end of 2013.

Sharp criticism by Prime Minister Vladimir Putin 

Then-Russian Prime Minister Vladimir Putin sharply criticized Zyuzin for reduced export prices (claiming they stood at half the domestic prices) at a steel industry meeting which discussed the high domestic prices of coal and other raw materials on July 24, 2008. Zyuzin claimed that he was indisposed to excuse himself from the meeting, and Putin promised to call “doctors” for him, personified by the Federal Antimonopoly Service and criminal investigators. This was a “horrendous blow” to Zyuzin according to Forbes.

However, Mechel survived owing to support it received from outside. Problems at Mechel began literally a few months before the Great Recession affected the global economy, Zyuzin was able to get support for refinancing his loans from Western banks. Putin said in June 2010 that Zyuzin took the criticism to heart and “has done everything [to “mend his ways”] and is on his best behavior towards customers and the [Russian] law.”

Decline of net value 

After Vladimir Putin’s criticism, Igor Zyuzin took action to improve his standing and reputation with the government and government officials. More specifically, he participated in a project in 2009 to save the Zlatoust Steel Plant, which had fallen on hard times. However, the project, widely cited as an “example of excellent social responsibility,” was ultimately a failure, and in 2013 companies controlled by Zyuzin initiated bankruptcy proceedings against the plant. Zyuzin received new criticism for this from the Russian media.

Mechel disclosed in June 2009 that more than half of Zyuzin’s stake in Mechel — 37.9% out of 66% — was pledged as security to bank loans. After this Mechel’s debt continued to grow rapidly. The company’s net debt stood at US$9.1 billion as of September 30, 2012. By year-end 2013, Zyzin had lost most of his fortune after a steep decline in Mechel stock price. Forbes named this loss the “fiasco of the year,” estimating Zyuzin’s fortune as of December 3, 2013 at no more than US$300 million, or a mere 2 per cent of the peak value. By late November 2013, banks held lien for 88% of Zyuzin’s entire Mechel stake.

Managerial skill and wealth rankings 

Kommersant business daily ranked him fifth among senior managers in the Metals and Mining Sector in 2010. With a personal fortune of US$8.9 billion, he was ranked 16th on the Forbes list of 200 richest Russian business people. After losing a substantial portion of his net value in 2013 due to Mechel stock decline, he dropped out of the top 100 of the Forbes list. A number of business news websites, newspapers and magazines claimed at the time that Putin’s diatribe against Zyuzin caused a panic on the Russian stock market, triggering a market-wide sell-off from which the stock market took years to recover.

Appraisals 

Forbes magazine describes Igor Zyuzin as a man of tempers, who can be extremely stubborn and incapable of negotiation and compromise – character traits that have made him many opponents. The Magazine also claims that Igor Zyuzin has never granted an interview in his life.

Family 

Igor Zyuzin is married and a father of two.

References

External links
 https://web.archive.org/web/20091205091220/http://www.wealthyrussian.com/zyuzin-igor-biography.html 

1960 births
Russian businesspeople in metals
Living people
Russian mining businesspeople
People from Kimovsky District